Cowie is an historic fishing village in Kincardineshire, Scotland. This village has existed since the Middle Ages, but in current times it is effectively subsumed into the town of Stonehaven.

History
William Camden recorded the existence of Cowie in 1596 in his historical writings. (Watt, 1985)  Notable historic features in the vicinity include Cowie Castle (now ruined), Chapel of St. Mary and St. Nathalan (now ruined), the Stonehaven Tolbooth, Muchalls Castle and Fetteresso Castle. Cowie Village was situated at the southern end of the ancient Causey Mounth trackway, which road was constructed on high ground to make passable this only available medieval route from coastal points south from Stonehaven to Aberdeen. This ancient passage specifically connected the River Dee crossing (where the present Bridge of Dee is situated) via Portlethen Moss, Muchalls Castle and Cowie Castle to the south. (Hogan, 2007) The route was that taken by William Keith, 7th Earl Marischal and the Marquess of Montrose when they led a Covenanter army of 9000 men in the battle of the Civil War in 1639. (Watt, 1985)

Birthplace of Air Breathing Life 
The foreshore near Cowie Harbour was the finding place of Pneumodesmus newmani, the oldest fossil of an air-breathing land organism Pneumodesmus.

See also
Barony of Cowie 
Cowie Castle
Morthouse

References

 Hogan, C. Michael, Causey Mounth, Megalithic Portal, ed. A. Burnham, Nov. 3, 2007
 Watt, Archibald, Highways and Byways around Kincardineshire, Stonehaven Heritage Society (1985)

Villages in Aberdeenshire
Stonehaven